Jagtar (23 March 1935 – 30 March 2010) was a Punjabi poet. He was widely credited for being a stickler for meter and rhyme. He was very popular among the politically conscious Punjabi readers having left-wing leanings. In the early period of his popularity he was known by his pen name Jagtar “Papiha” which he later dropped.

Life
Jagtar was born at Rajgomal, Jallandhar district, in  Punjab Province, British India. In the early 1970s he attended Panjab University to do his masters in Punjabi literature and did his Ph.D. on the critical study of Punjabi poetry in Pakistan from 1947 to 1972. He served as a college lecturer for most of his life. He wrote 32 books.

Works
 Ruttan-ranglian (1957)
 Talkhian ranginian (1960)
 Dudh pathiri (1961)
 Adhura manukh(1967)
 Lahu de naksh (1973)
 Chhangya rukh (1976)
 Sheeshe da jungle (1980)
 Janjriyan vich ghiriya Samundar (1985)
 Chunakri Sham (1990)
 Jugnu Deeva Te Dariya (1992)
 Akhan Waliya Paidan (1999)
 Prawesh Dwar (2003)
 Mom de Lok (2006)
 Pashāwara toṃ Sindha taka : safaranāmā

References

Punjabi-language writers
Poets from Punjab, India
Indian male poets
20th-century Indian poets
1935 births
2010 deaths
20th-century Indian male writers
Recipients of the Sahitya Akademi Award in Punjabi